Pierre Kaempff (1 June 1897 – 18 August 1978) was a Luxembourgian bobsledder. He competed in the four-man event at the 1928 Winter Olympics.

References

External links
 

1897 births
1978 deaths
Luxembourgian male bobsledders
Olympic bobsledders of Luxembourg
Bobsledders at the 1928 Winter Olympics
Sportspeople  from Meurthe-et-Moselle